Kayeli may refer to:
the Kayeli people
the Kayeli language